Tagoro is a submarine volcano located off the southern coast of the island of El Hierro, in the Atlantic Ocean. It is part of the Canary Islands Seamount Province.

Eruption 

The volcano was born upon an eruption that started on 10 October 2011, at a location 1.8 km to the south of the island of El Hierro, more specifically the settlement of La Restinga.

From an initial height of 355 m below sea level, the volcano reached a maximum height of about 88 m below sea level as reported in February 2012. During the eruptive stage the volcano emitted amounts of magma, gases and heat, substantially altering the environment of the maritime area.

Hydrothermal phase 
After the eruptive stage, the volcano entered an hydrothermal phase by March 2012. Extensively monitored during the years after the eruption, Tagoro has fertilised the nearby maritime area releasing a large amount of dissolved inorganic nutrients.

References 
Citations

Bibliography
 
 

Geography of the Canary Islands
Seamounts of the Atlantic Ocean
Active volcanoes